The pullularius was the keeper of chickens used in alectryomancy, a form of public augury in ancient Rome. It was the job of the pullularius to throw food for the chickens, and shake the basket they were in, if need be, to get them to emerge. The cockerels were consulted by military leaders as a predictor of fortune.

References

Divination
Ancient Roman religion